John Bell House may refer to

in the United States
(by state)
John Bell House (Lexington, Kentucky), listed on the NRHP in Kentucky
John C. Bell House, Philadelphia, PA, listed on the NRHP in Pennsylvania
John Bell Farm, West Whiteland, PA, listed on the NRHP in Pennsylvania
John Y. Bell House, Cuero, TX, listed on the NRHP in Texas
John and Margaret Bell House, Spring Prairie, WI, listed on the NRHP in Wisconsin